Juan Diego Zelaya Aguilar (Born September 6, 1975) is a Honduran businessman, consultant and politician. Zelaya was born and raised in Tegucigalpa, Honduras. During his childhood and teen years he lived in Canada (Victoria) Honduras and Boston, Massachusetts.. He graduated from Loyola University at New Orleans, earning a bachelor's degree in Business Administration (Finance and Marketing).

Business 

Zelaya's business endeavors range from consulting services,  sms A2P providers, food and beverage industries, real estate and import/export activities in Central America, Spain and the United States.

Juan Diego Zelaya LinkedIn: https://www.linkedin.com/in/juan-diego-zelaya-aguilar-20111960/

Politics

Entry into Government: In 2002 Juan Diego Zelaya was appointed National Programme Coordinator for National Telephone Company's Expansion and Modernization project between HONDUTEL (national telco) and UNDP. This project deployed projects for 225 Million USD project and focused its efforts on bridging the national digital divide.

Deputy Mayor: In 2009 National Election, Juan Diego Zelaya  won as Tegucigalpa's Lieutenant Mayor. He was part of the team leading the recovery of public spaces like the Historic district with had been flooded by street vendors for 30 years.

Congress: In the 2013 National Elections, Juan Diego Zelaya won one of the 128 seats in the Honduran Congress, running for the state of Francisco Morazán for the National Party of Honduras.

He was reelected in the 2017 general elections and served until January 2022.

INFOP: In 2014, Zelaya was appointed as the executive director of the National Institute for Professional Formation INFOP. During his period as director of INFOP, Juan Diego Zelaya developed different programs. Among the programs developed during his time as Director are the creation of the most modern autotronics shop in Central America, and the creation of “Yes We Can” a free online English Lessons program. During his time as director, INFOP focused on teaching Hondurans different careers in different areas, such as Beauty stylist or becoming the owner of a micro enterprise.

National Party Secretary: In October 2015, he was nominated to become the National Party's Executive secretary. He became Secretary by Unanimous Decision from the 50 members of the National Board. He was confirmed as Executive Secretary again in June 2017 by unanimous decision after the Party's 2017 Convention. He served as Party Secretary until April 2018.

Consul General of Honduras in New York: Zelaya served as Consul General of Honduras in New York in 2018.

Zelaya has also worked as campaign manager and general consultant to various candidates at all levels.

References

1975 births
Living people
Deputies of the National Congress of Honduras
National Party of Honduras politicians